Rugged Island may refer to:
Rugged Island (Alaska)
 Rugged Island (South Shetland Islands)
 Rugged Island parish, fictional Irish parish in the Father Ted series